Saša Tešić (Serbian Cyrillic: Саша Тешић; 7 March 1969 – 15 January 2020) was a Serbian footballer.

Club career

Radnički Vršac
Tešić's first professional club was Radnički Vršac. He played 10 years for club from Vršac where he live most of his life. His coach was Ilija Radak.

Borac Čačak
In First League of FR Yugoslavia team Borac Čačak Tešić didn't got opportunities to play, and he decided to join FK Bor soon.

Bor
The best moments in his career Tešić made in FK Bor. He played very good for this team from 1995 to 1998. With this famous club in Eastern Serbia, Tešić made promotion to Second League, and they were very close to get this club back to top league in Serbia, but did not succeed.

Priština
In FK Priština, Tešić played the last season, 1998-99 that the club spent in the top league in the First League of FR Yugoslavia. Despite being a centre back, Tešić was the top scorer of the club. He even made a hat-trick in a win against Mogren.

Milicionar
In the 1999-2000 season, and since Priština abandoned the Serbian league system, he joined another top league club, FK Milicionar where he scored two league goals in the first season there and one in the 2000-01.

Vršac United
After 10-years break, Tešić decided in 2009 to accept his friends appeals to help local club, to get promotion to one league system up.

Personal life
Tešić was married to Tatjana. His son Danilo (born 2001), also trained football in the same club Vršac United.

Honours and awards

 Bor:
Gold Badge of the Bor Municipality in (1): 1997

References

External links
 Saša Tešić Saša interview for the magazine of famous people from Bor Municipality

1969 births
2020 deaths
Footballers from Belgrade
Serbian footballers
FK Borac Čačak players
FK Bor players
FC Prishtina players
FK Milicionar players
Association football defenders